Ronald Raines may refer to:

Ron Raines (born 1949), American actor known for the role of Alan Spaulding on Guiding Light
Ronald T. Raines (born 1958), American chemical biologist and professor at the Massachusetts Institute of Technology
Ronald Raines (politician) (born 1929), Australian politician